The Commercial (Second) functional constituency is a functional constituency in the elections for the Legislative Council of Hong Kong first created in 1985. The constituency is composed of 421 corporates members of the Chinese General Chamber of Commerce entitled to vote at general meetings of the Chamber. The individual members were no longer eligible to vote after the 2021 electoral overhaul.

No actual election has been held since its creation in 1985 as all candidates have been uncontested until 2021.

Return members

Electoral results

2020s

2010s

2000s

1990s

1980s

References

Constituencies of Hong Kong
Constituencies of Hong Kong Legislative Council
Functional constituencies (Hong Kong)
1985 establishments in Hong Kong
Constituencies established in 1985